Nicolás Antonio de Arredondo, Pelegrin, Ahedo Zorilla de San Martin y Venero (17 April 1726 – 4 April 1802) was a Spanish soldier and politician born in the village of Bárcena de Cicero on Spain's Atlantic Coast. He was the fourth viceroy of the Río de la Plata between 4 December 1789 and 16 March 1795.

Biography
Before entering politics Arredondo fought in wars on Italy, where he earned military prestige. He was sent to the Americas and took political roles in Cuba. Afterwards, he was designed as governor in La Plata, modern Bolivia. In 1789 he was designated as viceroy of the Viceroyalty of the Río de la Plata, after the departure of Nicolás del Campo. As viceroy, he improved the layout of the streets of Buenos Aires and fortified the city of Montevideo. He created local councils and police corps, gave a boost to animal husbandry, mediated between the conflicts of business people and ranchers, and fought against contraband. He resigned in 1795 and returned to Spain, remaining involved in politics until his death.

His son, José Joaquín de Arredondo, was a Spanish soldier in New Spain in the two decades before Mexican independence.

References

Viceroys of the Río de la Plata
1726 births
1802 deaths